Russia competed at every edition of the IAAF World Championships in Athletics 1993 to the 2017 World Championships, from which its athletes have been banned from competing as Russian. In order for Russian nationals to compete at the World Athletics Championship (from 2017 on), they must be approved as authorised neutral athletes by the IAAF. Prior to 1993, Russian athletes competed for the Soviet Union. Russia has the second-highest medal total among nations at the competition (153), after the United States. At 47 gold medals, it holds the third-highest total after the United States and Kenya. It has had the most success in women's events and in field events. As a major nation in the sport of athletics, it typically sent a delegation numbering over 100 athletes.

It topped the medal table at the 2001 tournament, overtaking the United States following the redistribution of medals due to doping cases. Russia also initially finished top of the medal table at the 2013 Moscow Championships, but lost this position due to doping disqualifications of its athletes. Russia's performance at the competition has been strongly affected by doping. Furthermore, the country's doping problems are distinct because in Russia doping is supplied to the athletes by the government. The country was banned from competing in 2017 due to the state-sponsored doping and Russians had to gain special dispensation to compete as Authorised Neutral Athletes. Various members of the Russian delegation have been banned for doping at every edition of the competition it has competed at, with the exceptions of 2003 and 2015 (though Russian medalists in both those years were subsequently banned).

Russia's most successful athlete at the competition is horizontal jumps specialist Tatyana Lebedeva, who between 2001 and 2009 won two triple jump gold medals, a long jump title, and two further silver medals. Women's pole vaulter Yelena Isinbayeva has also won three gold medals, in addition to a bronze. Yuliya Pechonkina, a 400 metres hurdles and relay athlete, has won the most medals for Russia, with her total of seven. The most successful Russian man at the World Championships is high jumper Yaroslav Rybakov, who won three high jump silvers before becoming champion in 2009.

Medal table

Medalists

Doping

References 

IAAF Statistics Book – IAAF World Championships London 2017
Kenya at the 2017 World Championships in Athletics

 
Russia
World Championships in Athletics